The Chalcodryidae are a family of beetles in the superfamily Tenebrionoidea. It contains at least five species in two genera Chalcodrya and Philpottia, which are endemic to New Zealand. They are generally found associated with moss or lichen covered branches, with the larvae having been found to be associated with dead twigs. It is thought that they are noctural, feeding on lichen and other plant material at night. The genera Sirrhas and Onysius, formerly placed in this family, have subsequently been transferred to Promecheilidae.

Taxonomy
It contains these genera and species:

 Genus Chalcodrya Redtenbacher, 1868
 Chalcodrya bifasciata Broun, 1880
 Chalcodrya calida Broun, 1880
 Chalcodrya cylindrata Broun, 1880
 Chalcodrya hilaris Watt, 1974
 Chalcodrya minor Broun, 1880
 Chalcodrya nigellus Broun, 1880
 Chalcodrya nigricorne Broun, 1880
 Chalcodrya nubeculosa Broun, 1880
 Chalcodrya pullum Broun, 1880
 Chalcodrya undulata Broun, 1880
 Chalcodrya ustatus Broun, 1880
 Chalcodrya variegata Redtenbacher, 1868

 Genus Philpottia Broun, 1915
 Philpottia levinotis Watt, 1974
 Philpottia mollis (Broun, 1886)

References

Tenebrionoidea
Beetle families